Pertusaria rupicola is a species of lichen belonging to the family Pertusariaceae.

It is a known host species to the lichenicolous fungus species Lichenostigma rupicolae.

See also
 List of Pertusaria species

References

rupicola
Lichens of Europe
Lichen species
Lichens described in 1826